The Hopeful Stakes is an American Thoroughbred horse race run annually at Saratoga Race Course in Saratoga Springs, New York. Open to two-year-old horses, the Hopeful is the first Grade I stakes for two-year-olds each season and historically has been a showcase for some of the top East Coast horses at that age group. Raced on the dirt over a distance of seven furlongs, the Grade I event currently offers a purse of $350,000.

Inaugurated in 1903, the first edition was won by Delhi who went on to win the 1904 Belmont Stakes. In 1904, the Hopeful Stakes was won by the filly Tanya. She would go on to win the 1905 Belmont Stakes.

Initially raced at a distance of six furlongs, from 1925 through 1993 it was run at six and a half furlongs and since 1994 at seven furlongs. Currently, the Hopeful Stakes is the first influential prep race leading up to the Breeders' Cup Juvenile and since 1925 has been a competition that marks the first time two-year-olds are tested at a distance beyond six furlongs. The name stems from the hope that every two-year-old handler has for their horse's racing future.

Due to the State of New York's legislated ban on parimutuel betting, there was no race in 1911 and 1912. During World War II, the Hopeful Stakes was run at Belmont Park in 1943, 1944, and 1945.

Only four horses have ever won all three Saratoga stakes events for two-year-olds. Regret (1914), Campfire (1916), Dehere (1993), and City Zip (2000) each swept the Hopeful Stakes, Saratoga Special Stakes, and the Sanford Stakes.

In 2008, the race was sponsored by Three Chimneys Farm of Midway, Kentucky.

Records
Time record: (at current 7 furlong distance)
 1:21.29 – Jackie's Warrior (2020)

Most wins by an owner:
 4 – George D. Widener Jr. (1928, 1950, 1961, 1966)

Most wins by a jockey:
 6 – Jerry D. Bailey (1982, 1983, 1999, 2000, 2003, 2005)
Most wins by trainer:
 8 – D. Wayne Lukas (1990, 1991, 1995, 1999, 2000, 2009, 2013, 2017)

Winners

 In 1979, Rockhill Native finished first but was disqualified and placed sixth.

References

 August 14, 1904 New York Times article on Tany's win in the inaugural Hopeful Stakes
 The 2008 Hopeful Stakes at the NTRA
 Ten Things You Should Know About the Hopeful Stakes

1903 establishments in New York (state)
Horse races in New York (state)
Saratoga Race Course
Flat horse races for two-year-olds
Grade 1 stakes races in the United States
Graded stakes races in the United States
Recurring sporting events established in 1903